The 2020 Quebec Tankard the Quebec men's provincial curling championship was held from January 19 to 26 at the Arèna de Salaberry in Salaberry-de-Valleyfield, Quebec. The winning Alek Bédard rink represented Quebec at the 2020 Tim Hortons Brier in Kingston, Ontario and finished with a 1–6 record. The event was held in conjunction with the 2020 Quebec Scotties Tournament of Hearts, Quebec's provincial women's curling championship.

It is the third time in the last 11 years that Salaberry-de-Valleyfield played host to the provincial championships.

Teams
Teams were as follows

Preliminary round

Standings
Final round-robin standings

Round-robin results
Scores

Draw 1
Sunday, January 19, 20:30

Draw 2
Monday, January 20 9:30

Draw 3
Monday, January 20, 14:30

Draw 4
Monday, January 20, 19:30

Draw 5
Tuesday, January 21, 8:15

Draw 6
Tuesday, January 21, 12:45

Draw 7
Tuesday, January 21, 15:45

Draw 8
Tuesday, January 21, 19:30

Draw 9
Wednesday, January 22, 8:15

Draw 10
Wednesday, January 22, 12:00

Draw 11
Wednesday, January 22, 15:45

Draw 12
Wednesday, January 22, 19:30

Draw 13
Thursday, January 23, 9:30

Tiebreakers
Thursday, January 23, 14:30

Championship round

Standings
Final Standings

Scores

Draw 15
Thursday, January 23, 19:30

Draw 17
Friday, January 24, 14:30

Draw 18
Friday, January 24, 19:30

Playoffs

1 vs. 2Saturday, January 25, 15:003 vs. 4Saturday, January 25, 15:00SemifinalSaturday, January 25, 20:00FinalSunday, January 26, 13:30''

References

External links
 Official website

Quebec Men's Provincial Curling Championship
Curling in Quebec
Quebec Men's Provincial
Quebec Tankard
Salaberry-de-Valleyfield